Instruments key:
s, Sopranino
S, Soprano
A, Alto
T, Tenor
B, Baritone
b, Bass
c, Contrabass (or tubax)
sc, Subcontrabass

Indicators key:
X, instrument has been used by person or group
X, instrument has been used by person or group, but much less often than other X-marked instruments
C, person or group uses a C melody saxophone (either as primary instrument, or in addition to the normal tenor sax)
F, person or group uses an F Mezzo-soprano saxophone in addition to the E♭ alto sax.

Fictional players 

 Bleeding Gums Murphy (The Simpsons)
 Henry Jones Jr. (The Young Indiana Jones Chronicles, soprano)
Carl (Llamas with Hats, unknown)

See also

Lists of musicians
List of jazz saxophonists

References

 Saxophonists
Saxophone